The Minnesota Labor Relations Act is a Minnesota labor relations statute that was enacted in 1939.

References

Further reading
Heaney, Gerald W., and Robert Latz. "The Minnesota and National Labor Relations Acts--A Substantive and Procedural Comparison". Minnesota Law Review, vol. 38, no. 7, June 1954, p. 730-796.
Stieber, Jack. Ten years of the Minnesota Labor Relations Act. Vol. 9. Industrial Relations Center, University of Minnesota, 1949.
Stieber, Jack. "Minnesota Labor Relations Act-An Opinion Survey." Harvard Business Review 27.6 (1949): 665-677.
Heaney, Gerald. "Labor Relations--A National or a State Problem."  Minn. L. Rev. 26 (1941): 359.

United States labor legislation
Minnesota statutes
1939 in American law